DC: The New Frontier is an Eisner, Harvey, and Shuster Award-winning six-issue comic book limited series written and drawn by Darwyn Cooke, and published by DC Comics in 2004. The series was collected into two trade paperback volumes in 2004 and 2005, an Absolute Edition in 2006 and a deluxe edition in 2015. The story was adapted into an animated film, Justice League: The New Frontier, which was released on February 26, 2008.

The series was influenced by both DC Comics' long history and series like Kingdom Come, The Golden Age, Watchmen and The Dark Knight Returns. Much like The Golden Age, New Frontier is set primarily in the 1950s and depicts Golden Age superheroes Superman, Batman and Wonder Woman meeting Silver Age characters The Flash, Green Lantern and Martian Manhunter. The story bridges the gap between the end of the Golden Age and the beginning of the Silver Age in the DC Universe.

Setting
The New Frontier is set between 1945 and 1960, tracing the decline of the so-called Golden Age and the beginning of the Silver Age of comic books. Golden Age characters such as Superman, Wonder Woman and Batman meet Silver Age characters, such as Martian Manhunter, Green Lantern and The Flash. Cameo appearances by President Dwight D. Eisenhower and Vice President Richard Nixon and references to the Korean War, atomic testing, the civil rights movement and the Soviet Union provide historical context. The storyline is inspired by comic books and films of the period, including the novel and film versions of Tom Wolfe's The Right Stuff. The series attempts to re-imagine and pay homage to the era of culture and political turmoil which ushered in the presidency of John F. Kennedy. The title of the comic evokes the Kennedy's iconic "New Frontier" speech.

Plot

In 1945, the Losers are sent to a remote island to rescue Rick Flag and the ex-Nazi scientist his unit was escorting. A mysterious tidal wave strands the Losers and they are picked off one by one by the island's dinosaur population until Johnny Cloud and the unit's dog "Pooch" are the only survivors. Cloud meets up with Flagg, who is the only survivor of his own group. Cloud helps Flagg escape, but he and Pooch stay behind to kill the Tyrannosaurus rex that had slaughtered the Losers. After leaving behind a final message in the cave he had taken refuge in, Cloud manages to kill the T-rex at the cost of both his and Pooch's lives.

In the 1950s, World War II has ended, and the world has entered the Atomic Age. McCarthyism and anti-Communist attitudes has led to vigilantism becoming outlawed; the Justice Society of America disband, and various superheroes are either retired, arrested, or, in the case of the more supernatural heroes, simply left Earth. Government sanctioned heroes such as Superman and Wonder Woman continue to operate while other vigilantes, such as Batman and Hourman, evade arrest. Hourman is eventually captured while Batman and Superman stage a fight that would allow the former to continue to operate without interference from the government.

Hours after the end of the Korean War, fighter pilots Hal Jordan and Kyle "Ace" Morgan clash with North Korean forces unaware of the war's end. Encountering a soldier, Hal is forced to kill him in self-defense, and his traumatized reaction to the ordeal gets him marked as a coward by his peers. Meanwhile, in the early years of the Vietnam War, Superman meets with Wonder Woman, who has rescued a village of women kept in slavery by the Viet Cong, and confronts her about her violent actions while Wonder Woman is incredulous about Superman's idealism.

In 1955, Martian J'onn J'onzz is accidentally transported to Earth by scientist Dr. Erdel, who suffers a fatal heart attack upon seeing the alien. Using his telepathic and shapeshifting abilities, J'onzz takes the identity of Gotham City Detective John Jones, living as an honest cop while studying humanity's present knowledge of Martians. In 1956, Barry Allen is struck by lightning and splashed with chemicals which grant him super speed, turning him into the superhero known as The Flash. In 1957, Jones and Slam Bradley stop a cult from sacrificing a young boy with help from Batman. Intrigued by the book the cult had been using, Jones confiscates it as evidence.

After a boxing match between Ted Grant and Cassius Clay, Captain Cold attempts to rob the casino the afterparty is held in. The Flash arrives to apprehend Cold. Shortly after, Ace tells Hal about a job offer from Ferris Aircraft, which Hal accepts. During his job interview with Carol Ferris, the two begin a relationship. Later, Ace, Matthew Ryan, Leslie "Rocky" Davis and Walter Mark "Prof" Haley survive a devastating plane crash, and are inspired by their survival to form the Challengers of the Unknown. In Knoxville, a black man named John Wilson survives a lynching by the Ku Klux Klan, and takes on the vigilante identity of "John Henry" to avenge his murdered family and launch a reign of terror against the Klan.

Hal goes through various grueling tests before being accepted by King Faraday to join a NASA expedition to Mars, a response to detection of Jones's arrival to Earth. Meanwhile, Jones is confronted by Batman, who gives him a medallion that the cult leader was wearing. Using the medallion as a key to open the cult's book, Jones discovers to his horror the presence of an alien entity known as "The Centre", which is pulling humanity's psyche into its thrall. Jones later discovers from a rogue NASA scientist and Faraday's mind that a rocket to Mars is being constructed, and is enticed to return home after witnessing humanity's fear and hate towards different races. While testing in a flight simulator, Hal is forced into mission control after his reckless behavior angers Flagg.

Later, John Henry is captured, tortured, and murdered by the Klan. Soon after, the Flash, having survived an attempted capture by Faraday, publicly announces his retirement out of disillusionment. These events convinces Jones to accept that he will never have a place among humans and decide to return home by stowing away on the rocket to Mars. Under the guise of quitting the Gotham Police, Jones hands over all of his notes and investigation into the Centre to Batman.

As the rocket prepares launch, Jones attempts to sneak in, only to be caught by Faraday. Faraday is knocked unconscious in the struggle and Jones is forced to abandon his chance to return to Mars to save Faraday from the fire. On board the rocket, a crew member falls under the sway of the Centre and causes the rocket to malfunction. As Jones is captured by Faraday, Superman and the Challengers attempt to rescue Flagg and Karin Grace, but fail when the nuclear payload on board meant to attack any Martian enemies explode, killing Flagg and Grace. 

Haunted by Flagg's death, Hal mingles around the simulator, only to be abducted by a green ring. He's taken to Abin Sur, who had been injured by the explosion that had killed Flagg. Abin declares Hal his replacement as Green Lantern, and dies from his injuries. Meanwhile, Batman meets up with Superman and informs him of Jones's notes about the Centre, passing the responsibility due to the scope of the situation.

Themyscira is soon attacked by the Centre, now revealed to be the island that Cloud had claimed to be sentient, in its path towards the American east coast. A heavily injured Wonder Woman flies in her invisible jet to warn of the attack just as Superman had finished dispatching a scout from the Centre. Lois Lane unveils the Centre to the world in a broadcast, prompting many to gather in an attempt to help defeat the creature, including Green Arrow, Adam Strange, Ray Palmer, the Blackhawks, the Sea Devils and Barry Allen who comes out of retirement. Powering an experimental saucer with his ring, Hal also joins the fight.

The gathered heroes initially butt heads, but Superman manages to rally them. However, his initial attempt to scout the Centre results in him seemingly being killed. Initially disheartened, the group formulate a plan to detonate a nuclear payload within the Centre's interior before using the Flash and Ray Palmer's white dwarf lens to shrink and damage the Centre's atomic structure. Hal, Ace, and Captain Nathaniel Adam launch the first stage of the attack. Adam is seemingly killed in the explosion while Hal uses the ring to save himself and Ace in the nick of time. Jones is overwhelmed by the psychic attack from the Centre and briefly falls under its control, but Faraday sacrifices himself by absorbing the mental strain and is killed. The Flash succeeds in shrinking the Centre's mass, having run at the speed of light across its surface. As the Centre destabilizes, it attempts to continue its rampage. Hal uses his Green Lantern ring to wrap the Centre into a bubble and throws it into space, where it is destroyed. As Hal flies off to enjoy outer space, Aquaman arrives with Superman, who has survived the Centre's attack.

The book ends with a montage of a new age of heroes narrated with the eponymous "New Frontier" speech by John F. Kennedy, as well as the formation of the Justice League of America as it battles Starro the Conqueror.

Continuity
New Frontier includes elements of the Golden and Silver Ages which did not appear until the 1970s. Many characters appeared as they did when they were created, and were not retconned to fit the era and story. Barry Allen becomes the Flash in 1956 (the year of his first appearance in the comics) and Hal Jordan acquires the power ring and becomes Green Lantern in 1959, the same year that story was published.

Although Cooke said that New Frontier took place in the pre-Crisis on Infinite Earths continuity, he did not use the period-accurate Earth-One and Earth-Two Multiverse concepts; he used a post-Crisis continuity variant, where Golden and Silver Age heroes exist in a unified timeline rather than separate realities. The New Frontier universe was one of the 52 Earths in the DC multiverse (Earth-21).

Style

The New Frontier's style has several influences: Jack Kirby's squared fingers, muscles and jaws; the clean lines of Golden Age-era comics; the Fleischer Superman cartoons; Batman: The Animated Series, and other shows in the DC animated universe; Cooke was an artist on many of the latter. His style resembles that of Bruce Timm.

Awards
The series received Eisner Awards for Best Limited Series, Best Coloring and Best Publication Design, Harvey Awards for Best Artist, Best Colorist and Best Continuing or Limited Series and received the Shuster Award for Outstanding Canadian Comic Book Cartoonist (Writer-Artist). In 2007, when the series was released as an Absolute Edition, it received an Eisner Award for Best Graphic Album (Reprint) and a Harvey Award for Best Graphic Album of Previously Published Work.

Film

The story was adapted as a direct-to-video animated film, written by Stan Berkowitz and produced by Bruce Timm with Darwyn Cooke as story and visual consultant. Rated PG-13, it was released in the United States on February 26, 2008 on DVD, HD DVD, Blu-ray and pay-per-view.

Collections
As of February 2019, the series has been collected in two softcover collections, an Absolute Edition, a deluxe edition, and a DC Black Label Edition:
 DC: The New Frontier: Volume One (#1-3)
 DC: The New Frontier: Volume Two (#4-6)
 DC: The New Frontier: Absolute Edition (#1-6)
 DC: The New Frontier: Deluxe Edition (#1-6, material from DC The New Frontier: Absolute Edition, and the Justice League: The New Frontier Special)
 DC: The New Frontier (DC Black Label Edition) (#1-6, behind-the-scenes material, and the Justice League: The New Frontier Special)

Merchandise
DC Direct first released a line of action figures based on the series in July 2006:
 Wave 1 - Blackhawk, Green Arrow, Green Lantern, Superman, and Wonder Woman (July 2006)
 Wave 2 - Batman, Dr. Fate, Martian Manhunter and The Flash (December 12, 2007)

A box set of Batman, Superman, Green Lantern and Wonder Woman (with a new head), including a reprint of Justice League: The New Frontier Special, was released in April 2009.

Sequels

Solo #5 (2005), written and drawn by Darwyn Cooke, included a short story ("Triangulation: A New Frontier Thriller", also known as "King of America") with King Faraday set in pre-revolutionary Cuba.

Justice League: The New Frontier Special was released in May 2008 as a follow-up to the Justice League: The New Frontier DVD. Stories included Batman vs. Superman, a post-New Frontier story where Robin teams up with Kid Flash for the first time and a Mad Magazine-style story with Wonder Woman and Black Canary.

References

External links
Grand Comics Database index of original series

DC Comics limited series
Harvey Award winners for Best Continuing or Limited Series
Eisner Award winners for Best Graphic Album: Reprint
Eisner Award winners for Best Limited Series
Eisner Award winners for Best Publication Design
Comics set during the Cold War
DC Comics adapted into films